Pentyurino is a rural locality (a village) in Beryozovskoye Rural Settlement, Beryozovsky District, Perm Krai, Russia. The population was 145 as of 2010.

Geography 
It is located on the Shakva River, 3 km north of  Beryozovka (the district's administrative centre) by road. Shishkino is the nearest rural locality.

References 

Rural localities in Beryozovsky District, Perm Krai